Time Warp is a 4 player Solid State Electronic pinball machine from September 1979 produced by Williams. A total of 8,875 units were produced.

Description

The table features a variety of mythological and historical themes. The inclusion of Da Vinci's Vitruvian Man on the backglass may be the only depiction of male nudity from a pinball machine manufacturer. The artwork is by Constantino Michell, whose hidden signature can be found on the back of the glass, behind the glove of the time wizard.

It features electronic sound, with the background sound increasing in pitch and intensity as more points are accumulated, making it seem as though the machine is about to explode if the ball stays in play long enough. The pitch and intensity of sound return to normal at the commencement of a new ball.

Banana Flippers

It is notable for being only one of two pinball machines (Williams' 1978 Disco Fever being the other) to ever use curved "banana flipper bats, which made the ball easier to trap. Other notable features are the five pop bumpers which is unusual in a standard width game according to PinWiki.com. The 'Banana' (or curved) Flippers were standard on many but not all Time Warp units.  According to Barry Oursler, the game's designer, approximately the last 2000 of Time Warp's production came with normal flipper bats.

Marketing

According to TNT Amusements INC, this was the first time Williams Electronics, Inc. used color coordination advertising.

The Marketing slogan was "Where future and past collide, the action is unreal!" ...the profit time bomb.

In pop culture

The Time Warp machine is featured in the Carlo Verdone film Troppo forte. The "Time Warp" pinball machine is also seen in the 2000 American metafiction horror film Book of Shadows: Blair Witch 2 The Time Warp is also addressed in the comic book "Death Save" by Rune Ryberg

References

External links

1979 pinball machines
Williams pinball machines